CrossBoundary Energy Limited is an investment company that invests in renewable energy (solar, wind and battery storage) projects in Africa. It focuses on the supply of electricity to commercial and industrial consumers. The firm is a subsidiary of the CrossBoundary Group.

Location
The headquarters of CrossBoundary Energy are located along Waiyaki Way, in the central business district of Nairobi, the capital and largest city of Kenya.

Overview
As of July 2022, CrossBoundary Energy owns and operates renewable energy power stations which supply electricity to businesses and industries in over a dozen countries in Africa. At that time the company's portfolio was in excess of US$188 million, with a diverse client list, including AB InBev, Diageo, Heineken and Unilever, among others.

Ownership
As of July 2022, the shareholding in the stock of CrossBoundary Energy was as illustrated in the table below.

Projects
One of the projects that CrossBoundary Energy has invested in is the Balama Solar Power Station, in Balama District in Cabo Delgado Province, in northern Mozambique. The power station, with the attached battery storage extension supplies the  Balama Graphite Mine, owned and operated by Syrah Resources.

Recent events
In June 2022, CrossBoundary Energy raised US$25 million in equity and debt financing from ARCH Emerging Markets Partners Limited (equity), Bank of America (debt) and Microsoft Climate Innovation Fund (debt). These funds were specifically  intended to invest in new solar mini-grids in Africa. In July 2022, Norfund and KLP Norfund Investors jointly invested another US$40 million in CrossBoundary Energy, to increase the company's portfolio of renewable energy generation projects.

See also
 Economy of Kenya
 Energy in Africa

References

External links
 Official Website
 CrossBoundary Energy Partnership With USAID.

Electric power companies of Kenya
Renewable energy
Companies based in Nairobi
Energy companies established in 2011
Renewable resource companies established in 2011
2011 establishments in Kenya